Katharina Lang (born 2 January 1993) is a German 4.5 point national wheelchair basketball player who plays in the wheelchair basketball league for the University of Alabama, and for the German national team, with which she won bronze at the 2018 Wheelchair Basketball World Championship in Hamburg.

Biography
Katharina Lang was born in Munich on 2 January 1993. She began playing basketball when she was five years old. In 2009 she became a German U16 national champion with Bad Aibling, where one of her teammates was her twin sister Franziska, who went on to play for  OSB Munich. Lang's own basketball career was dogged by a series of knee injuries. She tore her anterior cruciate ligament five times - in 2009, 2010, 2011, 2012 and 2014 - and after the final injury it looked like her sporting career was over. But her former coach was now coaching wheelchair basketball in Munich, and encouraged her to give the sport a go.

A 4.5 point player, Lang made her international debut with the German national team in 2017 in the 2017 European Wheelchair Basketball Championship in Tenerife, Spain, where the German team won silver. She then joined the team at the University of Alabama in the United States, where she studied marketing.  She went on to win bronze at the World Championships before a home crowd in Hamburg in 2018, and at the European Championships in Rotterdam the following year.

In 2020, as a result of the COVID-19 pandemic, foreign students were instructed to leave the United States, but Lang still managed to complete her bachelor's degree with honours remotely in 2021, even though this meant attending lectures at four in the morning due to the time difference, and won the University of Alabama Adapted Athletics Academic Award for academic achievements by a member of an adapted athletics team. She also required surgery on her left shoulder that year that put her out of action for five months.

Lang returned to playing in Alabama in the 2020–21 season, when she was captain of the team that won the national title and won MVP. later that year she was part of the German team at the 2020 Summer Paralympics, where the German team lost the bronze medal match against the United States and finished fourth.

Achievements
 2017: Silver at the European Championships (Tenerife, Spain)
 2018: Bronze at the World Championships (Hamburg, Germany)
 2019: Bronze at the European Championships (Rotterdam, Netherlands)

Notes

External links 
 Katharina Lang (video)
 University of Alabama Wheelchair Basketball's Katharina Lang and Rosalie Lalonde (video)

German women's wheelchair basketball players
Alabama Crimson Tide women's basketball players
1993 births
Living people
Sportspeople from Munich
Wheelchair basketball players at the 2020 Summer Paralympics
Paralympic wheelchair basketball players of Germany